FK Bosna 92 Örebro is a Swedish football club located in Örebro in Örebro County.

Background
Fotbollklubb Bosna 92 Örebro was founded on 10 October 1994 by a few football enthusiasts with a common interest. In the beginning the club ran into several setbacks but persevered with the support of their many loyal supporters who go by the name BosnaFans.

Since their foundation FK Bosna 92 Örebro has participated in the lower divisions of the Swedish football league system.  In 2010 the club played in Division 3 Västra Svealand, which is the fifth tier of Swedish football, but finished in a relegation position and in 2011 will play again in Division 4 Örebro. They play their home matches at the Örnsro IP in Örebro.

FK Bosna 92 Örebro are affiliated to the Örebro Läns Fotbollförbund.
As of 2018 they compete in the 10th tier

Season to season

Attendances

In recent seasons FK Bosna 92 Örebro have had the following average attendances:

Footnotes

External links
 FK Bosna 92 Örebro – Official website
 FK Bosna 92 – Club website

Sport in Örebro
Football clubs in Örebro County
Association football clubs established in 1994
1994 establishments in Sweden